Mari Bjørgan (7 November 1950 – 30 November 2014) was a Norwegian actress and variety show comedian, born in Stavern.

She acted in both movies and on television, but is best known from variety shows and one person shows. She had great success with her performances 101 valentinere and Norge rundt med buksa nede.

Select filmography
 1992: Nordexpressen 
 1989: Bryllupsfesten 
 1985: Deilig er fjorden!
 1985: Noe helt annet 
 1982: 50/50
 1982: Brødrene Dal og spektralsteinene (television miniseries)
 1981: Julia Julia

References

External links

1950 births
2014 deaths
People from Larvik
Norwegian stage actresses
Norwegian film actresses
Norwegian television actresses
Norwegian women comedians